Branoux-les-Taillades is a commune in the Gard department in southern France, and in the region Occitanie.

Geography

Localization 
Branoux is located near the mountain la Baraque, and close to the D32 road, on a relatively flat place called la Plaine. Les Taillades is an extension due to the demographic boom caused by the influx of workers and miners employed in la Grand-Combe. Les Taillades was built in the Gardon valley, on the right bank and crossed by the RN106. Blannaves is a hamlet, mostly in ruins and close to the Cambous Lake.

Hamlets 
 L'Abrit
 L'Arenas
 Branoux
 Le Camp des Nonnes
 Le Castanet de Blannaves
 La Civadière
 Le Fraissinet
 Le Galissard
 Le Lauzas
 Mas de Léon
 Le Monnier
 La Planquette
 Les Taillades

Population

Politics and administration

Political trends and results

List of mayors

City council

Sister towns

See also
Communes of the Gard department

References

Communes of Gard